Jennifer Warren is an American actress, producer and film director.

Early life and education
Warren's uncle was Yiddish theatre actor and director Jacob Ben-Ami.

Career
Warren made her Broadway debut in 1972 in 6 Rms Riv Vu, for which she won a Theatre World Award. She appeared in the short-lived P.S. Your Cat Is Dead!. Warren's film credits include Sam's Song (1969), Night Moves (1975), Slap Shot (1977, as the frustrated wife of hockey player Paul Newman), Another Man, Another Chance (1977), Ice Castles (1978), Mutant (1984), and Fatal Beauty (1987). She was listed as one of the 12 "Promising New Actors of 1975" in John Willis' Screen World, Volume 27. She also played a role in Steel Cowboy (1978). Her television credits include guest roles on The Bob Newhart Show, Kojak, Cagney & Lacey, Hotel, Hooperman, Murder, She Wrote, and others. She had a featured role as Dinah Caswell, a former model and mother of an aspiring model in the 1982 TV movie Paper Dolls, and the 1984 television series based on the movie. 

Warren finished production on Partners in Crime, her second directorial feature, once again starring Hauer, with Paulina Porizkova, in 1998. The film was distributed in America by Artisan Films during the 1999/2000 year and appeared on Direct TV. A member of the Academy of Motion Picture Arts and Sciences and Women in Film, she was a founding member and past president of the Alliance of Woman Directors and continues to support the organization. She has taught at Wesleyan University, Johns Hopkins University, UCLA Extension, and the University of Tel Aviv. She is an associate professor at USC's School of Cinematic Arts.

Personal life
Warren married producer Roger Gimbel in 1976. They had a son, Barney, who is a writer and editor. Roger Gimbel died April 26, 2011.

Filmography
 Sam's Song (1969)
 Night Moves (1975)
 Banjo Hackett: Roamin’ Free (1976)
 Slap Shot (1977)
 Another Man, Another Chance (1977)
 Ice Castles (1978)
 Freedom (1981)
 Mutant (1984)
 Fatal Beauty (1987)

References

External links

University of Southern California faculty
American film actresses
American women film directors
American stage actresses
Living people
Actresses from New York City
American film directors
Gimbel family
Little Red School House alumni
Year of birth missing (living people)